The discography of American rapper Freddie Gibbs consists of five solo studio albums, four collaborative studio albums, twenty-two singles, eight extended plays, twenty mixtapes, and one compilation mixtape.

In 2013, Freddie Gibbs released his debut solo studio album ESGN. It was followed by the collaborative album Piñata with producer Madlib in 2014, which became his first entry on the US Billboard 200 chart, peaking at number 39. The following year, Gibbs released his second solo album, Shadow of a Doubt.

His next studio release was You Only Live 2wice in 2017, followed by 2018's Fetti, a collaboration with The Alchemist and Currensy, and his fourth solo album Freddie. In 2019, he and Madlib released their second collaborative studio album Bandana, followed by another collaboration with The Alchemist, 2020's Alfredo, which became Gibbs' highest-charting album to date, peaking at number 15 on the Billboard 200 chart.

Studio albums

Collaborative albums

Compilation albums

EPs

Mixtapes

Singles

As lead artist

Guest appearances

Music videos

References

Discographies of American artists
Hip hop discographies